Platanthera huronensis, the Huron green orchid, is a species of orchid native to the United States and Canada. It has a discontinuous range, the eastern range including eastern Canada from eastern Manitoba to Labrador, plus New England and the Great Lakes states. The western range extends along the Rocky Mountains from New Mexico to Alberta, as well as the coastal ranges of Washington, British Columbia and southern Alaska (including the Aleutians).

References

External links 
 

huronensis
Orchids of Canada
Orchids of the United States
Plants described in 1835
Flora without expected TNC conservation status